Cory Hill (born 10 February 1992) is a Wales international rugby union player. His usual playing positions are blindside flanker and lock forward.

A lock forward who can also play at blindside flanker, Hill began his career with Pontypridd RFC and the Cardiff Blues.  In June 2013 he signed for Moseley and in November 2013 joined the Dragons. Hill rejoined Cardiff Blues for the 2020–21 season.

International

In April 2012 Hill was selected as captain of the Wales Under-20 squad for the Junior World Cup in South Africa.

Hill made his senior debut for Wales on 5 November 2016 versus Australia as a second-half replacement. He played in four of Wales' five games in the 2018 Six Nations, and captained his country against Argentina on the summer tour later that year.

On 16 June 2017, Hill was a mid-tour call up for the British & Irish Lions in 2017, provoking some controversy among the rugby press.

International tries

Controversy
In October 2021 it was revealed that Hill was one of three men who attacked a house in Rhondda Cynon Taf in May 2021. It was reported that Hill, under the influence of alcohol, mistakenly believed that the house was one of the rental properties he owned and that the tenant owed rent. This was incorrect and Hill actually attacked the home of a woman and her small children. Shortly after the incident, Hill left Cardiff Blues to play rugby for Yokohama Canon Eagles in Japan, bringing his Wales career to the end.

References

External links 
 Pontypridd RFC profile
 Dragons profile

Rugby union players from Pontypridd
Welsh rugby union players
Wales international rugby union players
Cardiff Rugby players
Moseley Rugby Football Club players
Dragons RFC players
Living people
1992 births
Pontypridd RFC players
Rugby union locks
Yokohama Canon Eagles players